Lachnocnema albimacula, the Libert's large woolly legs, is a butterfly in the family Lycaenidae. It is found in Ivory Coast, Ghana, Nigeria, Cameroon and the Republic of the Congo.

References

Butterflies described in 1996
Taxa named by Michel Libert
Miletinae